Paris Can Wait is a 2016 comedy film written, co-produced, and directed by Eleanor Coppola in her narrative directorial debut, as all of her previous directorial efforts had been documentaries and short films.

Plot
Anne (Diane Lane) is in Cannes with her husband Michael (Alec Baldwin), a prominent movie producer. As the festival ends, she learns that the vacation she and her husband were supposed to go on in Paris will be slightly delayed as they need to go to Budapest first. They plan to fly to Paris, but the pilot suggests Anne not fly due to an ear infection. Michael's producing partner Jacques offers to drive Anne to Paris himself.

What is supposed to be a short car ride quickly devolves into a pleasant leisurely trip as Jacques, a French foodie, can't resist taking any opportunity he can to stop every hour or so to sample new food. He is also openly flirtatious with Anne, but she begins to question his intentions when he repeatedly uses her credit card to foot the bill for the gourmet meals they are sampling.

They visit a church (the 11th-century Romanesque Basilica of St Magdalene in Vezelay, France) where Anne grieves the baby she lost, and tells Jacques she wears her locket necklace in his honor. They share a romantic dinner together where Jacques admires Anne's photography, and asks why she doesn't share it with her husband.

Later, on the road, Jacques confides that only he knows his brother's death was a suicide, and he carries that burden so his nephew doesn't have to know. They finally reach the place where Anne is staying and almost kiss, but the elevator doors close in on them.  Anne sees Jacques has driven away, but he returns to kiss her passionately and ask her to a rendez-vous with him later in San Francisco.

The morning after, just before her husband is meant to arrive in Paris, she receives a package from Jacques with chocolate roses and the money she had lent him on the trip. It includes a note that reminds her of the restaurant they will be meeting at, and she smiles at the camera, pleased.

Cast
 Diane Lane as Anne Lockwood
 Alec Baldwin as Michael
 Arnaud Viard as Jacques
 Élise Tielrooy as Martine
 Laure Sineux as Hotel Receptionist

Production
In February 2015, it was announced Eleanor Coppola would direct the film from a screenplay she had written, with Diane Lane, Yvan Attal and Nicolas Cage joining the cast of the film, with Fred Roos producing under their American Zoetrope banner. In September 2015, it was announced Arnaud Viard and Alec Baldwin had joined the cast of the film, replacing Attal and Cage, respectively, with Lifetime joining as a co-producer.

Filming
Principal photography began on June 15, 2015 and concluded on July 31, 2015.

Release
The film had its world premiere in the Special Presentations section at the 2016 Toronto International Film Festival on September 12, 2016. Shortly after, Sony Pictures Classics acquired U.S distribution rights to the film, be released it on May 12, 2017.

Reception
On review aggregator Rotten Tomatoes, the film has an approval rating of 47% based on 111 reviews, with an average rating of 5.39/10. The site's critical consensus reads, "Paris Can Waits likable stars are ill-served by a film that lacks interesting ideas or characters and has little to offer beyond striking travelogue visuals." On Metacritic, the film has a score of 48 out of 100, based on 25 critics, indicating "mixed or average reviews".

References

External links
 
 
 
 Locations of filming

2016 films
2016 comedy films
American comedy films
British comedy films
Films set in France
American Zoetrope films
Lifetime (TV network) films
Sony Pictures Classics films
2016 directorial debut films
Films directed by Eleanor Coppola
2010s English-language films
2010s American films
2010s British films